Brataas is a surname. Notable people with the surname include:

Nancy Brataas (1928–2014), American politician and consultant
Tone Heimdal Brataas (born 1970), Norwegian politician

See also
 Brattås